Niegowa  is a village in Myszków County, Silesian Voivodeship, in southern Poland. It is the seat of the gmina (administrative district) called Gmina Niegowa.

References

Villages in Myszków County
Piotrków Governorate